The Men's 800 metre freestyle competition of the 2018 African Swimming Championships was held on 11 September 2018.

Records
Prior to the competition, the existing world and championship records were as follows.

The following new records were set during this competition.

Results

Final ranking
The races were started on 11 September at 11:45.

References

Men's 800 metre freestyle